The Feste Hindersin renamed Gambetta fort by the French in 1919, is a military installation near Metz.  It is part of the first fortified belt of forts of Metz and had its baptism of fire in late 1944, when Battle of Metz occurred.

Historical context
The first fortified belt of Metz consists of forts de Saint-Privat (1870), of Queuleu (1867), des Bordes (1870), Saint-Julien (1867), Gambetta, Déroulède, Decaen, Plappeville (1867) and St. Quentin (1867), most of them unfinished in 1870, when the Franco-Prussian War bursts out. During the Annexation following this war, Metz, which oscillates between a German garrison of 15,000 and 20,000 men at the beginning of the period, overtakes 25,000 men in the garrison by the time of the First World War.  Gradually Metz becomes the first stronghold of the German Reich. It is therefore necessary to finish the fortifications there.

Construction and facilities  
The feste Hindersin is designed in the spirit of the "detached forts" concept developed by Hans Alexis von Biehler in Germany. The goal was to form a discontinuous enclosure around Metz with strong artillery batteries spaced with a range of guns. Designed to complement the defensive line north of Metz, the Feste Hindersin was built between 1879 and 1881.

Successive assignments   
From 1890 relief of the garrison is provided by the fort troops Corps XVI stationed at Metz and Thionville. Invested by the French army in 1919, the fort Hindersin was renamed "fort Gambetta". It was taken again in 1940 by the Germans. The German army occupied the fort during 1940–1944. The fort Gambetta is now disused.

Second world War  
On 2 September 1944, at the beginning of the Battle of Metz, the old city fortress is declared a fortress of the Reich by Hitler.  The fortress must be defended to the last by German troops, whose leaders were all sworn to the Führer. The German command integrates Fort Gambetta into the defensive system set up around Metz. The next day, 3 September 1944, the troops of General Krause take their positions on a line from Pagny-sur-Moselle to Mondelange, passing to the west of Metz by Chambley, Mars-la-Tour, Jarny and Briey.  After an initial withdrawal, made on 6 September 1944, the German lines, stationed by troops of the 462e Volksgrenadier division, now rest firmly on the forts of Metz.

The US offensive, launched 7 September 1944, on the west line forts of Metz, is cut short. American troops will eventually stop on the Moselle, despite taking two bridgeheads south of Metz.  As the forts are better defended than the Americans had thought, the US troops are now out of breath. General McLain, in agreement with the General Walker, decides to suspend the attacks, pending new plans of the General Staff of 90th Infantry Division. When hostilities resumed after a rainy month, the soldiers of the 462th Volks-Grenadier-Division still hold firmly the forts of Metz, though supplies are more difficult under artillery fire and frequent bombings.

As a prelude to the assault on Metz, on 9 November 1944, the US Air Force sends no less than 1,299 heavy bombers, both B-17s and B-24s, to dump 3,753 tons of bombs, and 1,000 to 2,000 "livres" on the fortifications and strategic points in the combat zone of IIIrd army. Most bombers drop bombs without visibility at over 20,000 feet, so the military targets are often missed. In Metz, 689 loads of bombs hit the seven forts of Metz, identified as priority targets, merely causing collateral damage, proving once again the inadequacy of the massive bombing of military targets.

After several weeks of fighting in the Messina region, US troops launched the final assault on Metz in November 1944. On 15 November 1944, 377th Infantry Regiment of 95th American division, leaving from Maizières-lès-Metz, enters Woippy.  Facing them, are the men of the 1515 Grenadier-Regiment " Stössel " of the 462e Volksgrenadier division, reinforced by a reserve company SS-Panzergrenadier Regiment 38, which give desperate resistance. Such harassing fighting continued all day on 16 November. The fort Gambetta is attacked in turn in the day by 3 Battalion 377 Infantry regiment.  On the night of 16 November 1944, under the pressure of 377 and 378 American regiments, the German grenadiers eventually fall back in disorder on Metz, leaving behind, artillery, trucks, weapons stocks and their dying. The bloody fighting continued the next day around the fort, which isolated and neutralized, finally surrenders.

The fort Jeanne-d’Arc was the last of the forts of Metz to surrender. Determined German resistance, bad weather and floods, inopportunity, and a general tendency to underestimate the firepower of the fortifications of Metz, have helped slow the US offensive, giving the opportunity to the German Army to withdraw in good order to the Saar. The objective of the German staff, which was to save time by stalling US troops for the longest possible time before those troops could reach the Siegfried Line, is largely achieved.

See also
 Forts of Metz   
 Fortifications of Metz   
 Battle of Metz

References

Bibliography
 

Fortifications of Metz
World War II defensive lines